Milan Harašta (September 16, 1919 – August 29, 1946) was a Czechoslovak opera and classical composer.

References

1919 births
1946 deaths
Czechoslovak musicians